Elizabeth Clare Douglas  (21 February 1944 – 9 July 2017) was a British film editor who received a BAFTA Award for Best Editing for the 2006 film United 93. Douglas worked extensively for British television, and had been nominated four times for BAFTA Television Editing Awards.

Biography
Following a degree in English and drama at Bristol University, Douglas entered a film program at Hornsey College of Art. She was a trainee at the BBC and worked as an editor there on a range of documentaries and dramas. Her freelance career began when Dennis Potter asked her to leave and edit for his company.

Bloody Sunday
Douglas was nominated for a BAFTA Television Craft Award for the editing of Bloody Sunday (2002), which was directed by Paul Greengrass. Bloody Sunday was honored by the Golden Bear award as best film at the Berlin International Film Festival. The editing of Bloody Sunday was noted in J. Hoberman's review of the film: The editing of Black Hawk Down (2001) had just won Pietro Scalia an Academy Award when Hoberman was writing his review. In a similar vein, Tor Thorsen wrote:

United 93

United 93 was directed by Paul Greengrass, and was edited by Douglas, Christopher Rouse, and Richard Pearson. The use of three editors for the film was dictated by its short production period, which was less than six months between the start of filming and release of the film. Greengrass and Douglas had worked together quite successfully on the film Bloody Sunday (2002); Greengrass, Rouse, and Pearson had just edited The Bourne Supremacy (2004). Despite the accelerated production schedule for United 93, the editing was very successful. In addition to the BAFTA award, the editors were also nominated for an Academy Award for Film Editing and for an ACE Eddie award. Ellen Feldman wrote an analysis of the film's editing.

The Lost Prince and the le Carré Miniseries

Douglas' later BAFTA television nomination was for editing The Lost Prince (2003), which was written and directed by Stephen Poliakoff; The Lost Prince won a Primetime Emmy Award for Outstanding Miniseries.

Much earlier, Douglas had been nominated twice as best editor for two miniseries based on John le Carré's espionage novels Tinker, Tailor, Soldier, Spy (directed by John Irvin-1979) and Smiley's People, (1982) which was directed by Simon Langton. Douglas also edited a third miniseries based on le Carré's novel A Perfect Spy (1987).
Douglas died on 9 July 2017, aged 73.

Selected filmography
Director indicated in parenthesis.

References

External links

The Text by Claire Douglas

1944 births
2017 deaths
Best Editing BAFTA Award winners
British film editors
British women film editors
People from Ipswich